Richard Gasquet was the defending champion, but lost in the second round to Jo-Wilfried Tsonga.

Sébastien Grosjean won in the final 7–6(7–4), 6–4, against Marc Gicquel.

Seeds

Draw

Finals

Top half

Bottom half

External links
 Main Draw
 Qualifying draw

Singles
2007 ATP Tour